Anderson Pedro da Silva Nunes Campos (born 20 November 1983), simply known as Anderson, is a Brazilian footballer

Club career
Born in Recife, Pernambuco, Anderson finished his formation with hometown club Santa Cruz. He made his Série A debut for the side on 25 October 2006, starting in a 0–1 home loss against Fortaleza.

In 2008 Anderson left the club, and subsequently signed for Comercial de Ribeirão Preto. After loan stints at Ferroviário and Campinense, he joined América-PE in 2010.

In October 2010 Anderson moved to Mogi Mirim, after being approved by the club's president Rivaldo. He also served temporary deals at CRB and Ituano, both as a starter.

Anderson subsequently had two stints at Oeste and Linense. On 18 August 2015 Anderson signed a one-year deal with Portuguesa.

Honours
Santa Cruz
Campeonato Pernambucano: 2005

Bahia
Copa do Nordeste: 2017
Campeonato Baiano: 2018, 2019, 2020

References

External links

1983 births
Living people
Sportspeople from Recife
Brazilian footballers
Association football goalkeepers
Campeonato Brasileiro Série A players
Campeonato Brasileiro Série B players
Campeonato Brasileiro Série C players
Santa Cruz Futebol Clube players
Comercial Futebol Clube (Ribeirão Preto) players
Ferroviário Atlético Clube (CE) players
Campinense Clube players
Mogi Mirim Esporte Clube players
Clube de Regatas Brasil players
Ituano FC players
Oeste Futebol Clube players
Clube Atlético Linense players
Associação Portuguesa de Desportos players
Grêmio Novorizontino players
Esporte Clube Bahia players